TIMvision (formerly Cubovision) is an Italian Internet video on demand (VOD) service by Telecom Italia.

It offers television shows, movies and TV series, for rental or purchase through the use of a decoder as well as video on demand, smart TV, Android and iOS device. From 2018, TIMvision produces original TV shows, such as the Italian version of Skam, known as Skam Italia.

Device support
The devices featured in this list feature hardware that is compatible for streaming TIMvision:
 Android smartphones and tablets
 Android TV devices
 Apple: iPad, iPhone
 Microsoft: Windows 8, Windows 10, Windows 11
 Sony: some Blu-ray Disc players, CTVs
 LG: some Blu-ray Disc players, CTVs
 Samsung: some Blu-ray Disc players, CTVs

References

External links
 

Telecom Italia
Video on demand services
2009 establishments in Italy
Internet properties established in 2009